Maria Papoila is a 1937 Portuguese comedy film directed by Leitão de Barros.

Cast
 Mirita Casimiro: Maria Papoila
 António Silva: Mr. Scott, the American
 Eduardo Fernandes: Eduardo da Silveira
 Alves da Costa: Carlos
 Maria Cristina: Margarida Nonronha Baptista
 Joaquim Pinheiro: Soldier 27
 Virginia Soler: Elvira, the cook
 Amélia Pereira: D. Casimiria
 Perpétua dos Santos: Aunt Joaquina
 José Amaro

References

External links

1937 films
Portuguese black-and-white films
1937 comedy films
Films directed by José Leitão de Barros
Films set in Portugal
Portuguese comedy films
1930s Portuguese-language films